In enzymology, a CoA-disulfide reductase is an enzyme that catalyzes the chemical reaction

2 CoA + NAD(P)+  CoA-disulfide + NAD(P)H + H+

The 3 substrates of this enzyme are CoA, NAD+, and NADP+, whereas its 4 products are CoA-disulfide, NADH, NADPH, and H+.

This enzyme belongs to the family of oxidoreductases, specifically those acting on a sulfur group of donors with NAD+ or NADP+ as acceptor.  The systematic name of this enzyme class is CoA:NAD(P)+ oxidoreductase. Other names in common use include CoA-disulfide reductase (NADH2), NADH2:CoA-disulfide oxidoreductase, CoA:NAD+ oxidoreductase, CoADR, and coenzyme A disulfide reductase.

References

 
 
 
 

EC 1.8.1
NADPH-dependent enzymes
NADH-dependent enzymes
Enzymes of unknown structure